The Heineken Lanka Limited (formerly Asia Pacific Brewery (Lanka) Limited (APB Lanka) is the second largest brewer in Sri Lanka.

History
United Breweries Limited was established as a joint venture between Mauritius Breweries Limited Offshore, a wholly owned subsidiary of Phoenix Beverages Limited (a leading beverage group from Mauritius), the A.P. Casie Chitty Company Limited and Hilary Company Limited in 1997.

The construction of the company's Rs 550 million brewery in Mawathagama commenced in early 1997 and was completed in 1998, with an annual production capacity of 120,000 hectolitres.

In September 2005 Asia Pacific Breweries acquired a 60% stake in United Brewery, partnering with the Sri Lankan-based Anandappa family group (20%) and MBL Offshore Limited (20%). Asia Pacific Breweries is a Singaporean-based joint venture between Heineken International and Fraser and Neave. The company was subsequently renamed Asia Pacific Brewery Lanka Limited.

In February 2017 the company changed its name again to Heineken Lanka Limited to reflect its relationship with the Heineken Group. The Heineken Group having acquired full control of Asia Pacific Breweries Ltd in 2012 and rebranding it as Heineken Asia Pacific in 2013.

Products
APB Lanka produces a range of King beers, including King's Lager, King's Pilsner, King's Stout and Bison Super Strong (Bison XXtra), as well as Anchor, ABC Stout and Baron's Strong Brew.

See also

 Beer in Sri Lanka

References

External links 
Official site

Beer in Sri Lanka
Food and drink companies established in 1998
Drink companies of Sri Lanka